Lawrence Thompson Stromgren (born 1936) is a former American football coach.  He served as the head football coach at the College of Emporia in Emporia, Kansas from 1965 to 1966 and Fort Hays State University in Hays, Kansas, from 1969 to 1971, and compiling a career college football coaching record of 18–25–2. Stromgren was born in 1936 in Osage City, Kansas.

Head coaching record

College

References

1936 births
Living people
College of Emporia Fighting Presbies football coaches
College of Emporia Fighting Presbies football players
Fort Hays State Tigers football coaches
High school football coaches in Kansas
People from Osage City, Kansas
Players of American football from Kansas